Juan Restrepo may refer to:
Juan Camilo Restrepo Salazar (born 1946), Colombian politician
Juan David Restrepo (born 1979), Colombian actor
Juan Sebastián Restrepo (1984–2007), Colombian-American soldier and medic